McFarlane may refer to:

Business 
McFarlane Toys, a toy manufacturer

People 
McFarlane (surname)

See also 
McFarlane's Evil Prophecy, a 2004 video game
McFarlan (disambiguation)
MacFarlane (disambiguation)